is a Japanese professional baseball catcher for the Hokkaido Nippon-Ham Fighters in Japan's Nippon Professional Baseball.

His wife is Reni Takagi, a member of Japanese idol group Momoiro Clover Z .

Professional career

On November 16, 2018, he was selected Yomiuri Giants roster at the 2018 MLB Japan All-Star Series exhibition game against MLB All-Stars.

On June 26, 2019, Usami and teammate, pitcher Mitsuo Yoshikawa were traded to the Fighters for pitchers, Yohei Kagiya and Takahiro Fujioka.

References

External links

NPB.com

1993 births
Living people
Japanese baseball players
Nippon Professional Baseball catchers
Baseball people from Chiba Prefecture
People from Matsudo
Yomiuri Giants players
Hokkaido Nippon-Ham Fighters players